Marcel Melecký (born 17 December 1975) is a Czech former football player and current manager of FC Hlučín.

Club career
He played top-flight football for the first time with FC Baník Ostrava in the 1995–96 season. He went on to play football with Bohemians in the Gambrinus liga for four more seasons, where he made 84 appearances and scored six goals. He also spent six seasons playing in the Czech 2. Liga for Frýdek-Místek, Bohemians, Kladno and Hlučín.

In November 2001 Melecký scored the goal which ended Petr Čech's record-breaking run of 903 minutes without conceding a goal.

Career statistics

References

External links
Marcel Melecký at Footballdatabase

1975 births
Living people
Czech footballers
Czech football managers
Czech First League players
FC Baník Ostrava players
Bohemians 1905 players
SK Kladno players
FC Hlučín players
Association football midfielders